36 Hours may refer to:

 36 Hours (1953 film), a British film directed by Montgomery Tully
 36 Hours (1965 film), an American suspense film based on the short story "Beware of the Dog" by Roald Dahl
 "36 Hours" (Brothers & Sisters episode), an episode of the television series Brothers & Sisters
 "36 Hours", an episode of The Good Doctor